The Battle of Alcoraz took place between 1094 and 1096 outside Huesca, pitting the besieging forces of Peter I of Aragon and Navarre against the allied forces of Al-Musta'in II of the Taifa of Zaragoza and García Ordóñez de Nájera and Gonzalo Núñez de Lara representing Alfonso VI of León and Castille. 

The siege had begun some two years earlier, in 1094, with Peter's father, Sancho Ramírez, who was encamped at the time in the Castle of Montearagon intent on retaking the City of Huesca from the Moors. While inspecting the siege efforts around the ramparts of Huesca, Sancho was struck and killed by an arrow. His son continued the siege, finally defeating the allied troops of Al-Musta'in that had come up from Zaragoza on the fields of Alcoraz, just outside of Huesca. 

Later legends hold that during the battle, Saint George appeared above the crown of Aragon, to inspire the Christian army who were heavily outnumbered in this first Reconquista. This parallels the legendary story of the Battle of Clavijo, over two hundred years earlier, where Saint James was similarly alleged to have appeared before the Christian forces of the Kingdom of Asturias in the battle against the Saracen armies. 

The heraldic war shield known as the Cross of Alcoraz which commemorated the battle was later adopted as the personal coat of arms of King Peter III of Aragon and subsequently incorporated into the flag of the Kingdom of Aragon where it remains to this day.

References
Antonio Ubieto Arteta. 1951. Una narración de la batalla de Alcoraz atribuida al abad pinatense Aimerico. Argensola: Revista de Ciencias Sociales del Instituto de Estudios Altoaragoneses, 7:245–56. 

Alcoraz
Alcoraz
Alcoraz
Alcoraz
1096 in Europe
11th century in Al-Andalus
Taifa of Zaragoza